George Vakakis (born 9 November 1943) is an Australian weightlifter. He competed in the men's light heavyweight event at the 1964 Summer Olympics.

References

1943 births
Living people
Australian male weightlifters
Olympic weightlifters of Australia
Weightlifters at the 1964 Summer Olympics
Place of birth missing (living people)
Commonwealth Games medallists in weightlifting
Commonwealth Games gold medallists for Australia
Weightlifters at the 1966 British Empire and Commonwealth Games
Medallists at the 1966 British Empire and Commonwealth Games